Willy Trepp (born 23 December 1938) is a retired Swiss track cyclist. He won two silver and one bronze medals in the individual pursuit at the world championships of 1959–1961, behind Rudi Altig. He also rode in the 1960 Tour de France.

Trepp was the cousin of Ice Hockey player Hans-Martin Trepp.

References 

1938 births
Living people
Swiss male cyclists